Thomas Enqvist defeated Tim Henman in the final, 7–6(7–5), 6–4 to win the singles tennis title at the 2000 Cincinnati Masters.

Pete Sampras was the defending champion, but lost in the third round to Henman.

Seeds 

  Andre Agassi (second round, retired)
  Pete Sampras (third round)
  Magnus Norman (second round)
  Gustavo Kuerten (semifinals)
  Yevgeny Kafelnikov (third round)
  Álex Corretja (first round)
  Thomas Enqvist (champion)
  Marat Safin (third round)
  Lleyton Hewitt (first round)
  Nicolás Lapentti (first round)
  Nicolas Kiefer (first round)
  Juan Carlos Ferrero (first round)
  Franco Squillari (quarterfinals)
  Younes El Aynaoui (withdrew)
  Tim Henman (final)
  Mark Philippoussis (third round)

Draw

Finals

Top half

Section 1

Section 2

Bottom half

Section 3

Section 4

External links 
 Main draw

Singles